"Auschwitz or the great alibi" (French: Auschwitz ou le grand alibi) is a 1960 article published in Programme communiste, the French magazine of the International Communist Party (ICP), later reedited in the form of a brochure. The authorship of this text has been attributed to both Amadeo Bordiga and Martin Axelrad. However, the Programme communiste was a Bordigist (edited by disciples of Amadeo Bordiga) revue, publishing its texts anonymously in order to emphasize its character of a collective work.

The work is seen by some as a form of Holocaust denial, arguing that the Auschwitz concentration camp could not have been created as an extermination camp because the bourgeoisie cannot act without a profit motive and therefore this was a labor camp in which members of the middle class exploited and exterminated other members of the middle class, thereby enabling capitalists to accumulate wealth. However, an actual reading of the text reveals that the existence of death camps were taken for granted and that the goal of the paper was not to deny death camps, but to explain why the bourgeoisie would view the extermination of Jews (and specifically Jews) as profitable. The text does not deny the horrors of the Holocaust, but instead makes the argument that the genocide was "a direct result of economic constraint".

Author 
The article was published in issue 11, dated April–June 1960, of the Programme communiste, organ of the ICP. The article starts out with a critique of a poster published by the MRAP and largely supports its argument on the book The History of Joel Brand. It was at first published in French, referring to a French context, which in itself made the attribution to the Italian communist Amadeo Bordiga problematic. According to an article in 2010 in Le Prolétaire, organ of the ICP, its author was in fact Martin Axelrad, a militant French Bordigist and of Jewish origin.

Thesis 
According to the author, or authors, of this article, the Nazis did not exterminate the Jews because they were Jews, but because they were an important group within the petite bourgeoisie, a social class condemned to disappear by the concentration of capital; and antisemitism in its modern form developed within that same petite bourgeoisie in an attempt to preserve itself as a class by sacrificing a particular part of itself. Concentrated German capital interests, when confronted with the economic crisis, it is claimed, saw this development as a windfall: "It could liquidate part of its petite bourgeoisie with the consent of the petite bourgeoisie, or even better, have the petite bourgeoisie itself take charge of this liquidation". Thus, according to the author(s), antisemitism was determined by socioeconomic conditions: 

The article refers to Adolf Eichmann's offer to "sell a million Jews" as related by the American relief worker Joel Brand to support the claim that the Nazis at first tried to get rid of the Jewish population by expelling them and that no other countries were prepared to receive them as these other countries were confronted with the same problems concerning their petite bourgeoisie. As the war aggravated the whole situation, the concentrated capital forces of Germany ended up organising the extermination of the Jews.

The phrase "Auschwitz or the great alibi" refers to the more specific claim that after the war the Shoah was made use of in order to demobilize the working class as part of a propaganda effort establishing a belief that the "antifascist democracies" were of an entirely different nature from fascism, making the working class forget, by being exposed to the relics of the extermination, that these were in fact the outcome of the same logic of capitalism that they themselves also were obeying. In this perspective, the exhortations to fight fascism in the name of democracy were in fact a lure destined to make the proletariat forget that their true enemy is and continues to be the capitalist system: It is in this sense that "Nazi barbarism" would be the "great alibi" of the capitalist democracies.

Reception 
The theses of Auschwitz or the great alibi have been contested by several leftist organisations, especially those with a main objective of fighting neo-fascism. On the other hand, the activist Pierre Guillaume, an adherent of Socialisme ou Barbarie, later with the Pouvoir ouvrier, referred to this text as part of a first stage that later led him to support negationism (disavowed by the ICP). This has made some say (notably Daniel Lindenberg, Valérie Igounet and in a more measured way Pierre Vidal-Naquet) that this brochure was the founding text of left-wing negationism: 

This interpretation has been vividly contested by the ICP itself, whilst denying the singularity of Nazi crimes and the Nazi ideology of the Third Reich, preferring to explain the genocide against the Jews by a socioeconomic materialist analysis:

Bibliography 
 Michel Dreyfus (2011). L'antisémitisme à gauche, histoire d'un paradoxe. La découverte. 345 p.
 Valérie Igounet (2000). Histoire du négationnisme en France. Paris. 691 p. 
 Pierre Vidal-Naquet (1987). Les Assassins de la mémoire : Un Eichmann de papier » et autres essais sur le révisionnisme. Paris: La Découverte. 227 p.

Notes and references

External links 
 International Library of the Communist Left: Auschwitz - the big alibi
 Philippe Bourrinet, The "Bordigist Current" (1919 - 1999) - Italy, France, Belgium

1960 documents
Auschwitz concentration camp
Bordigism
French-language works
Magazine articles
The Holocaust in popular culture
Works of uncertain authorship